Rainy River Water Aerodrome  is located on the Rainy River, Ontario, Canada.

The airport is classified as an airport of entry by Nav Canada and is staffed by the Canada Border Services Agency (CBSA). CBSA officers at this airport can handle general aviation aircraft only, with no more than 15 passengers. It shares its airspace and waterway with neighbouring Baudette International Airport in the United States.

References

Registered aerodromes in Rainy River District
Seaplane bases in Ontario
Binational airports